Xylosteus bartoni is the species of the Lepturinae subfamily in long-horned beetle family. This beetle is distributed in Bulgaria, and North Macedonia.

References

Lepturinae
Beetles described in 1933